Mill Shoals Township is located in White County, Illinois. As of the 2010 census, its population was 668 and it contained 338 housing units.

Geography

Demographics

References

External links
City-data.com
Illinois State Archives

Townships in White County, Illinois
Townships in Illinois
1871 establishments in Illinois